An international reply coupon (IRC) is a coupon that can be exchanged for one or more postage stamps representing the minimum postage for an unregistered priority airmail letter of up to twenty grams sent to another Universal Postal Union (UPU) member country. IRCs are accepted by all UPU member countries.

UPU member postal services are obliged to exchange an IRC for postage, but are not obliged to sell them.

The purpose of the IRC is to allow a person to send someone in another country a letter, along with the cost of postage for a reply. If the addressee is within the same country, there is no need for an IRC because a self-addressed stamped envelope (SASE) or return postcard will suffice; but if the addressee is in another country an IRC removes the necessity of acquiring foreign postage or sending appropriate currency.

Description 

International reply coupons (in French, Coupons-Reponse Internationaux) are printed in blue ink on paper that has the letters "UPU" in large characters in the watermark. The front of each coupon is printed in French. The reverse side of the coupon, which has text relating to its use, is printed in German, English, Arabic, Chinese, Spanish, and Russian. Under Universal Postal Union regulations, participating member countries are not required to place a control stamp or postmark on the international reply coupons that they sell. Therefore, some foreign issue reply coupons that are tendered for redemption may bear the name of the issuing country (generally in French) rather than the optional control stamp or postmark.

The Nairobi Model was an international reply coupon printed by the Universal Postal Union which is approximately 3.75 inches by 6 inches and had an expiration date of 31 December 2013. This model was designed by Rob Van Goor, a graphic artist from the Luxembourg Post. It was selected from among 10 designs presented by Universal Postal Union member countries. Van Goor interpreted the theme of the contest – "The Postage Stamp: A Vehicle for Exchange" – by depicting the world being cradled by a hand and the perforated outline of a postage stamp.

The Doha Model is named for the 25th UPU congress held in Doha, Qatar, in 2012. The Doha model, designed by Czech artist and graphic designer Michal Sindelar, shows cupped hands catching a stream of water, to celebrate the theme of Water for Life. It expires after 31 December 2017.

The Istanbul Model was designed by graphic artist Nguyen Du (Viet Nam) and features a pair of hands and a dove against an Arctic backdrop representing sustainable development in the postal sector. Ten countries participated in the competition which was held 7 October 2016, during the UPU congress in Istanbul, Turkey. It expires after 31 December 2021.

The Abidjan Model was designed by graphic artist Valeryia Tsimakhavets (Belarus) and features a Tree with New Leaves and Birds which represent the Eco-System and Climate Protection.  Congress held in Abidjan, (Cote d'Ivorie) - Ivory Coast on 9th to 27th August 2021. It expires after 31 December 2025.

History 
The IRC was introduced in 1906 at a Universal Postal Union congress in Rome. At the time an IRC could be exchanged for a single-rate, ordinary postage stamp for surface delivery to a foreign country, as this was before the introduction of airmail services. An IRC is exchangeable in a UPU member country for the minimum postage of a priority or unregistered airmail letter to a foreign country.

The current IRC, which features the theme "the Post and sustainable development", was designed by Vietnamese artist Nguyen Du for 2017-2021 and was adopted in Istanbul in 2016, it is known also as the "Istanbul model" for this reason. The previous design, "Water for Life" by Czech artist and graphic designer Michal Sindelar, was issued in 2013 and was valid until 31 December 2017.

IRCs are ordered from the UPU headquarters in Bern, Switzerland by postal authorities. They are generally available at large post offices; in the U.S., they were requisitioned along with regular domestic stamps by any post office that had sufficient demand for them.

Prices for IRCs vary by country. In the United States in November 2012, the purchase price was $2.20 USD; however, the US Postal Service discontinued sales of IRCs on 27 January 2013 due to declining demand. Britain's Royal Mail also stopped selling IRCs on 31 December 2011, citing minimal sales and claiming that the average post office sold less than one IRC per year. IRCs purchased in foreign countries may be used in the United States toward the purchase of postage stamps and embossed stamped envelopes at the current one-ounce First Class International rate (US$1.20 as of November 2020) per coupon.

IRCs are often used by amateur radio operators sending QSL cards to each other; it has traditionally been considered good practice and common courtesy to include an IRC when writing to a foreign operator and expecting a reply by mail. If the operator's home country does not sell IRCs, then a foreign IRC may be used.

Previous editions of the IRC, the Beijing, Nairobi, Doha and Istanbul Models and all post-2000 versions, bear an expiration date. The current IRC, the Abidjan Model, will be valid until 2025 and since 2009 new models have been issued every four years.

Current usage in various countries

Australia
As of October 2022, Australia Post no longer sells International Reply Coupons.

Finland
Posti sells International Reply Coupons for 3.25 EUR as of November 2022, and exchanges a valid one for 2.25 EUR worth of stamps.

France
La Poste sells IRC for 1.65 EUR as of 2022.

Germany
Deutsche Post sells IRC for 2 EUR as of 2022.

Hong Kong
International reply coupons are sold by the HongKong Post for 19 HKD as of 2022-12-01.

Italy
Poste Italiane is slowly phasing out the sales of IRC. The last series, named "Istanbul", was issued in 2017 in only 10,000 pieces, which expired at the end of 2021.

Japan
The Japan Post sells an IRC for 150 JPY, and exchanges a valid IRC for 130 JPY worth of stamps.

130 JPY is enough to deliver a letter all over the world by airmail (90 JPY by shipmail).

Switzerland
International reply coupons are sold by the Swiss Post in packs of 10 for 25 CHF.

Thailand
Thailand Post currently sells IRC for 53 THB as of 2020.

Turkey

As of 2022, Turkish Post only sells IRCs through their administration branches.

Turkish Post exchanges a valid IRC for 10 TRY worth of stamps as of 2021. 10 TRY is not enough to deliver a letter all over the world. (E.g. a postcard to Japan requires 21 TRY.)

United Kingdom
The Royal Mail stopped selling IRCs on 31 December 2011 due to a lack of demand.

United States
The United States Postal Service stopped selling international reply coupons on 27 January 2013.

The Ponzi scheme

In 1920, Charles Ponzi made use of the idea that profit could be made by taking advantage of the differing postal rates in different countries to buy IRCs cheaply in one country and exchange them for stamps of a higher value in another country. His attempts to raise money for this venture became instead the fraudulent Ponzi scheme. In practice, the overhead on buying and selling large numbers of the very low-value IRCs precluded any profitability.

The selling price and exchange value in stamps in each country have been adjusted to some extent to remove some of the potential for profit, but ongoing fluctuations in currency value and exchange rates make it impossible to achieve this completely, as long as stamps represent a specific currency value, instead of acting as vouchers granting specific postal services, devoid of currency nomination.

See also
Heys Collection

References

External links

 UPU IRC info
 UPU list of countries selling IRCs
 IRC info
 Some IRC illustrations and exchange guidelines 
 International Reply Coupons and Ham Radio

1906 establishments in Italy
1906 introductions
Universal Postal Union
Postal stationery
Philatelic terminology